Komšić is a Bosnian and Croatian surname. Notable people with the surname include:

Andrea Komšić (born 1996), Croatian alpine skier
Ivo Komšić (born 1948), Bosnian politician
Vlado Komšić (born 1955), former Yugoslavian footballer
Željko Komšić (born 1964), Bosnian politician 

Bosnian surnames
Croatian surnames
Slavic-language surnames
Patronymic surnames